George Ernest Wallace (born November 23, 1938) is an American politician who served from 2013 to 2016 as mayor of Hampton, Virginia. He previously served on the Hampton city council and as vice mayor. He lost reelection in 2016.  He was subsequently appointed to be the head of Hampton's Economic Development Authority, despite opposition from new Mayor Donnie Tuck.

See also
List of mayors of Hampton, Virginia

References

Mayors of Hampton, Virginia
Virginia Democrats
Living people
1938 births
Golden Gate University alumni
North Carolina Central University alumni
Politicians from Williamsburg, Virginia
African-American mayors in Virginia